KBRC (1430 AM and 102.9 FM) is a radio station that broadcasts a classic rock format. Licensed to Mount Vernon, Washington, the station serves the Skagit County, Washington area. It first began broadcasting in 1946. The station is currently owned by John and Julia Di Meo.

General information
KBRC was the first radio station to broadcast out of the Skagit Valley region, starting in 1946.  They played a classic hits format of music from the 1960s, 1970s, and some of the 1980s.  KBRC also broadcasts local Skagit County news as well as hourly news  reports from ABC.

Sports are an integral part of KBRC.  Local Skagit County sports contests are broadcast, as well as professional teams such as the Seattle Seahawks, the Seattle Mariners.  College sports events from the University of Washington football and basketball programs are also broadcast.

On November 19, 2018, KBRC changed their format from classic hits to classic rock.

References

External links
FCC History Cards for KBRC
KBRC website

Classic rock radio stations in the United States
Radio stations established in 1946
BRC
Mount Vernon, Washington
1946 establishments in Washington (state)